Queen Radio: Volume 1 is the first greatest hits album by rapper and singer Nicki Minaj. It was released through Young Money Entertainment and Republic Records on August 26, 2022. The album was re-released two days later to add a remix of Skeng's 2022 single, "Likkle Miss". 

The album includes songs from all of her studio albums—Pink Friday (2010), Pink Friday: Roman Reloaded and its reissue The Re-Up (both released in 2012), The Pinkprint (2014) and Queen (2018), as well as songs from mixtape Beam Me Up Scotty (original 2009 version and its 2021 reissue), Young Money Entertainment compilation Rise of an Empire (2014) and a few non-album singles she had released in 2022. It was surprise-released with no prior announcement. One of the 2022 singles and the opening track of the album, "Super Freaky Girl", debuted and peaked atop the Billboard Hot 100.

Critical reception
Andy Kellman of AllMusic called it a "generous anthology", while rating it 4.5 stars out of 5. Paper Mag Kenna McCafferty thought that "the 28 tracks were perfectly selected", as the collection is "jam-packed with [some of] Minaj’s biggest bangers".

Commercial performance
Queen Radio: Volume 1 debuted at number 10 on the US Billboard 200 chart, earning 32,000 album-equivalent units (including 3,000 copies in pure album sales) in its first week.

Track listing

Notes
 signifies a co-producer
 Original tracklist omits tracks 2–4.

Charts

Certifications

References

2022 greatest hits albums
Surprise albums
Nicki Minaj albums
Republic Records compilation albums
Young Money Entertainment albums